Benjamin Hope (born 1976) is a British artist, based in London.

Life
He grew up in Oxford, the son of the painter Jane Hope and an academic historian (two of his grandparents were also artists).

After studying Mathematics and Physics at the University of Warwick and taking Part III of the Mathematical Tripos at Cambridge University, he was awarded a PhD in theoretical nanoscience at Cambridge. He has been a competitive runner and earned four Cambridge Blues for cross-country.

Hope was invited to join the Oxford Art Society in 1999, and in 2001 his still-life Old Violin won the Oxford Times Critics' Choice at the society's Members' Exhibition. In 2002, for its 400th anniversary, the Bodleian Library commissioned a commemorative still-life.

On leaving academia in 2007, he worked as a risk analyst in the City of London in order to earn enough to start painting professionally.  In 2011, he left the City to paint full-time from his studio in Blackheath, South East London.

Work
Working mainly in oil, but also in charcoal, pastel, and pencil,
his works include plein air street scenes, detailed still lifes, and impressionistic portraits. The street scenes are mainly of locations in central and south London, while he has also painted landscapes beyond the capital. John Walsh in The Independent called him "a brilliantly accomplished impressionistic painter of street scenes."

His work has been selected for a number of exhibitions, including the Royal Academy Summer Exhibition in 2013. His  first solo show, Observations was staged by the JP Art Gallery in London in 2015. A joint exhibition with sculptor Ben Hooper was held at the Gallery Different in Fitzrovia in June 2017.

In 2018 he was elected to The Pastel Society and the New English Art Club.

Awards and recognition
Hope has won a number of prizes and awards:
Lynn Painter Stainers Prize, Runner Up (2014)
Pintar Rapido First Prize (2014)
Jackson's Prize, United Society of Artists Open Exhibition (2014)
Jackson's Pastel Portrait Competition, First Prize (2016)
New English Art Club: Mall Galleries Greetings Card Award (2016)

His work has been selected for exhibition in
Royal Academy Summer Exhibition, 2013
New English Art Club
The Pastel Society
Royal Institute of Oil Painters
Royal Society of British Artists
Royal Society of Portrait Painters.

Notes

References

External links
Benjamin Hope - Artist (official web site)

1976 births
Living people
21st-century English painters
Artists from Oxford
Alumni of the University of Warwick
Alumni of the University of Cambridge